The Wundt illusion is an optical illusion that was first described by the German psychologist Wilhelm Wundt in the 19th century. The two red vertical lines are both straight, but they may look as if they are bowed inwards to some observers. The distortion is induced by the crooked lines on the background, as in the Orbison illusion. The Hering illusion produces a similar, but inverted effect.

Vertical-horizontal illusion

Another variant of the Wundt illusion is the Horizontal–Vertical Illusion, introduced by Wundt in 1858. The two intersecting lines are equal in length although the vertical line appears to be much longer. The horizontal line needs to be extended up to 30% to match the perceptual length of the vertical line. This is not confined to simple line drawings, as this can also be seen in buildings, parking meters, as well as other things viewed in a natural setting.

References

Optical illusions